Santa María de Mulegé Airport or Playa María Airport is an airstrip located North of Santa Rosalía, Baja California Sur, Mexico. It is handled by the Municipality of Mulegé Government. The SMM code is used as identifier.

Airports in Baja California Sur
Mulegé Municipality